Zhang Hanxin (1 January 1936 – 1 October 2021) was a Chinese scientist specializing in fluid mechanics, and an academician of the Chinese Academy of Sciences. He was chairman of Chinese Aerodynamics Research Society.

Biography
Zhang was born in Pei County, Jiangsu, on 1 January 1936, during the Republic of China. He secondary studied at Xuzhou No. 2 High School. In 1954, he enrolled at Tsinghua University, majoring in the Department of Hydraulic Engineering. In 1963, he did his postgraduate work at the Institute of Mechanics, Chinese Academy of Sciences under the supervision of Guo Yonghuai. At the same time, he taught at Tsinghua University. In 1972, he was despatched to the China Aerodynamics Research and Development Center as a researcher.

On 1 October 2021, he died from an illness in Beijing, aged 85.

Honours and awards
 1991 Member of the Chinese Academy of Sciences

References

1936 births
2021 deaths
People from Pei County
Scientists from Jiangsu
Tsinghua University alumni
Academic staff of Tsinghua University
Members of the Chinese Academy of Sciences
Aerodynamicists